Mikalay Mikalayavich Kashewski (Nikolay Nikolayevich Kashevsky; born 5 October 1980) is a Belarusian football coach and former player.

Career
Kashewski has made 13 appearances for the Belarus national football team.

Honours
Gomel
Belarusian Cup winner: 2010–11
Belarusian Super Cup winner: 2012

Shakhtyor Soligorsk
Belarusian Cup winner: 2013–14

Spartaks Jūrmala
Latvian Higher League champion: 2016

References

External links

1980 births
Living people
People from Zhodzina
Belarusian footballers
Belarus international footballers
Belarusian expatriate footballers
Expatriate footballers in Ukraine
Belarusian expatriate sportspeople in Ukraine
Expatriate footballers in Latvia
Ukrainian Premier League players
Ukrainian Second League players
FC Torpedo-BelAZ Zhodino players
FC Darida Minsk Raion players
FC SKVICH Minsk players
FC Metalurh Zaporizhzhia players
FC Metalurh-2 Zaporizhzhia players
FC Kryvbas Kryvyi Rih players
FC Mariupol players
SC Tavriya Simferopol players
FC Gomel players
FC Shakhtyor Soligorsk players
FC Vitebsk players
FK Spartaks Jūrmala players
Association football midfielders
Sportspeople from Minsk Region